Alfred Taylor is the name of:

Alfred A. Taylor (1848–1931), U.S. Congressman and Governor of Tennessee
Alfred Taylor (British Army officer) (1862–1941), soldier and Member of Parliament, Rhodesia
J. Alfred Taylor (1878–1956), U.S. Representative from West Virginia
Alfred Edward Taylor (1869–1945), British idealist philosopher
Alf Taylor (cricketer) (1891–?), English cricketer
Alfred Taylor (cricketer) (1944–2009), Barbadian cricketer
Alfred Dundas Taylor (1825–1898), civil architect to the Admiralty in the UK
Alfred Swaine Taylor (1806–1880), English toxicologist and medical writer
Alfred Taylor (wrestler) (1889–?), British Olympic wrestler
Alfred Taylor (cinematographer), worked on the 1974 film The Teacher
Alfred Taylor (comics); see Knockout (UK comics)